The 2012 Old Dominion Monarchs football team represented Old Dominion University in the 2012 NCAA Division I FCS football season. They were led by fourth-year head coach Bobby Wilder and played their home games at Foreman Field at S. B. Ballard Stadium.  This was their final year as a member of the Colonial Athletic Association (CAA). In 2013, they began a two-year transition to the NCAA Division I Football Bowl Subdivision (FBS), where they became a member of Conference USA. They finished the season 11–2, 7–1 in CAA play to finish in first place. As a departing member from the CAA, they were ineligible for the CAA championship. They received an at–large bid to the FCS Playoffs, where they defeated Coastal Carolina in the second round before falling in the quarterfinals to Georgia Southern.

Heinicke's record year
In ODU's 64–61 comeback win over New Hampshire, sophomore quarterback Taylor Heinicke set his first of many records that season. He passed for 730 yards and compiled 791 yards of total offense, setting new Division I records for a single game.

During the loss to Georgia Southern in the FCS playoff quarterfinals,  Heinicke passed Steve McNair for the most passing yards in a single season by an FCS quarterback with 5,076 yards. He also became the first quarterback to eclipse the 5,000 yard mark in a season as well as setting the record for most completions in a season with 398 (Villanova's Brett Gordon held the previous record of 386 in 2002). At the conclusion of the season he led the nation in passing yards, passing yards per game, total offense, points responsible for, touchdown passes and total touchdowns.

For his performance and record-setting season Heinicke was named CAA Offensive Player of the Year, a first team All-American, the Dudley Award winner, the FCS Player of the Year, and the Walter Payton Award winner.

Joining Heinicke as All-Americans were teammates P Jonathan Plisco, DT Chris Burnette, WR Nick Mayers, LT Jack Lowney, and LS Rick Lovato.

Schedule

Ranking movements

Awards
All-Americans
Taylor Heinicke - QB
Jonathan Plisco - P
Chris Burnette - DT
Nick Mayers - WR
Jack Lowney - LT
Rick Lovato - LS

Walter Payton Award
Taylor Heinicke - QB

FCS Player of the Year
Taylor Heinicke - QB

CAA Offensive Player of the Year
Taylor Heinicke - QB

American Football Monthly FCS Coach of the Year
Bobby Wilder

 Old Dominion was named the winner of the Lambert Cup as the best FCS team in the East.

References

Old Dominion
Old Dominion Monarchs football seasons
Old Dominion
Old Dominion Monarchs football